Aliabad-e Yek (also Romanized as ‘Alīābād-e Yek; also known as ‘Alīābād) is a village in Fathabad Rural District, in the Central District of Baft County, Kerman Province, Iran. At the 2006 census, its population was 28, in 6 families.

References 

Populated places in Baft County